Shahabad Mohammadpur railway station is situated in Shahabad Mohammadpur village in Delhi, India. The village is in the hinterland of Indira Gandhi International Airport and is surrounded on three sides by the airport and on one side by the northern railway.

The village has a bus terminal.

References

Railway stations in Delhi